Alhaji Abubakar Sadiq Mohammed  (born 14 October 1961) in Nafada town LGA of Gombe state. He was appointed Nigerian Minister of Tourism, Culture and National Orientation on 6 April 2010, when Acting President Goodluck Jonathan announced his new cabinet.

He obtained a B.Sc (Physics) in 1985 from University of Maiduguri and an M.Sc (Physics) from the University of Ibadan.
He was a lecturer at the Federal University of Technology Yola (1986–1996). He was Managing Director or CEO of several companies between 1996 and 2002. He worked at the National Teachers Institute, Kaduna (2002–2008).
In 2008 he became Chief of Staff to the Deputy Speaker of the House of Representatives, Bayero Nafada.

References

Living people
Nigerian Muslims
Federal ministers of Nigeria
University of Maiduguri alumni
University of Ibadan alumni
Politicians from Gombe State
1961 births